The Village is a 1953 Swiss drama film directed by Leopold Lindtberg.

Cast
 John Justin as Alan Manning
 Eva Dahlbeck as  Wanda Piwonska
 Sigfrit Steiner as Heinrich Meile
 Mary Hinton as Miss Worthington
 W. Woytecki as Dr. Stefan Zielinski
 Guido Lorraine as Mr. Karginski
 Maurice Régamey as Mr. Faure
 Helen Horton as Miss Sullivan
 Roland Catalano as Signore Belatti
 Krystina Bragiel as Anja
 Voytek Dolinski as Andrzej
 Trevor Hill as Michael

Awards
Won
 3rd Berlin International Film Festival - Bronze Berlin Bear

Nominated
 1953 Cannes Film Festival - Palme d'Or

References

External links

1953 films
Swiss German-language films
1953 drama films
Swiss black-and-white films
Films directed by Leopold Lindtberg
Swiss drama films